Hohhot Metro or Hohhot Rail Transit is a metro system in Hohhot, Inner Mongolia, China.

Lines

Line 1

The color for Line 1 is red.

Line 1 began construction in April 2016 and was opened on 29 December 2019.

Line 2

It was opened on 1 October 2020. The color for Line 2 is blue.

Future Development
Lines 3, 4, 5 and 6 are under planning.

See also
 Baotou Metro
 Rapid transit in China

References

 
Hohhot
Rapid transit in China
Rail transport in Inner Mongolia
Transport infrastructure in China
2019 establishments in China
Railway lines opened in 2019